Still Cyco Punk After All These Years is the thirteenth studio album by the American crossover thrash band Suicidal Tendencies, released on September 7, 2018. This features re-recorded songs of Cyco Miko's 1996 debut album, Lost My Brain! (Once Again); it is a near-complete re-recording, since the only tracks from the original album not included are its last two tracks "Cyco Miko Wants You" and "Ain't Mess'n Around" (the latter, however, can be found on the Get Your Fight On! EP along with "Nothin' to Lose"), while "Sippin' from the Insanitea" was previously never released. The latter uses the same basic musical structure as "Cyco Miko Wants You", but with brand new lyrics and a different vocal melody.

The album's title is a play on Suicidal Tendencies' 1993 album Still Cyco After All These Years, which is also a collection of re-recorded and unreleased material. Still Cyco Punk After All These Years is also the last Suicidal Tendencies album with rhythm guitarist Jeff Pogan, who left the band two months prior to its release. First presses included a CD version, black vinyl and limited edition colours in blue, lime green, purple, and gold.

Track listing

Personnel
 Mike Muir – vocals
 Dean Pleasants – lead guitar
 Jeff Pogan – rhythm guitar
 Ra Díaz – bass
 Dave Lombardo – drums

Charts

References

2018 albums
Suicidal Tendencies albums